Noémi Németh (born 7 April 1986) is a Hungarian hammer thrower.

She finished ninth at the 2005 World Athletics Final.

Her personal best throw is 64.09 metres, achieved in June 2005 in Szombathely.

See also
List of hammer throwers

References

External links

Hungarian female hammer throwers
1986 births
Living people
Place of birth missing (living people)
21st-century Hungarian women